Lists of Academy Award winners